The British Mirpuri community comprises people in the United Kingdom who originate from the Mirpur District and surrounding areas in Pakistan-administered Azad Jammu and Kashmir, thus being a part of the Mirpuri diaspora. While no accurate statistics are available, an estimated 60 to 70 per cent of British Pakistanis in England trace their origins to the administrative territory of Azad Kashmir in northeastern Pakistan, mainly from the Mirpur, Kotli and Bhimber districts. 

Mirpuris started settling in Britain in the 1940s, transferring their workmanship on British merchant navy ships to the industrial needs of the growing British economy. The migration accelerated after the construction of the Mangla Dam in 1966, which submerged vast areas of farmland in the Mirpur district.

Population
Large Azad Kashmiri communities can be found in Birmingham, Bradford, Manchester, Leeds, Luton and the surrounding towns.

History
Migration from the princely state of Jammu and Kashmir began soon after the Second World War as the majority of the male population of this area and the Potohar region worked in the British armed forces, as well as to fill labour shortages in industry. But the mass migration phenomenon accelerated in the 1960s, when, to improve the supply of water, the Mangla Dam project was built in the area, flooding the surrounding farmlands. Up to 50,000 people from Mirpur (5% of the displaced) resettled in Britain. More joined their relatives in Britain after benefiting from government compensation and liberal migration policies.

Cultural assimilation and social issues
Mirpur was considered to be a conservative district in 1960s, and life in its rural villages was dominated by rigid hierarchies. The first generation Mirpuris were not highly educated, and they had little or no experience of urban living in Pakistan. An economic boom brought dramatic changes to the area after its residents began migrating to Europe, especially the UK, bolstering remittances to Pakistan. Families in Pakistan are close knit and the guiding influence behind everything from marriage to business. The current literacy rate of Azad Jammu and Kashmir is 78%, compared with 45% in Pakistan. In Azad Jammu and Kashmir, primary school enrolment is 80% for boys and 74% for girls.

The community has made notable progress in UK politics and a sizeable number of MPs, councillors, lord mayors and deputy mayors are representing the community in different constituencies.

Endogamy and kinship
Cousin marriages or marriages within the same tribe and caste system are common in some parts of South Asia, including rural areas of Pakistan. A major motivation is to preserve patrilineal tribal identity. As a result, there are some common genealogical origins within these tribes. Some British Pakistanis view cousin marriages as a way of preserving this ancient tribal tradition and maintaining a sense of brotherhood.

A small scale study of 100 randomly selected British Pakistani mothers was published in 1988 in the Journal of Medical Genetics, which looked specifically at two hospitals in West Yorkshire, found that the rate of consanguineous marriage was 55 per cent and rising, compared to a worldwide rate of 29 per cent. However, this rate is significantly lower than in Pakistan, where consanguineous marriages are estimated to be at 73 per cent.

Representatives of constituencies where there are high Pakistani populations say that consanguineous marriages amongst British Pakistanis are now decreasing in number, partly because of public health initiatives.

Forced marriage
According to the British Home Office, as of 2000, more than half the cases of forced marriage investigated involve families of Pakistani origin, followed by Bangladeshis and Indians. The Home Office estimates that 85 per cent of the victims of forced marriages are women aged 15–24, 90 per cent are Muslim, and 90 per cent are of Pakistani or Bangladeshi heritage. 60 per cent of forced marriages by Pakistani families were linked to the small towns of Bhimber and Kotli and the city of Mirpur.

Identity
Christopher Snedden writes that most of the native residents of Azad Kashmir are not of Kashmiri ethnicity; rather, they could be called "Jammuites" due to their historical and cultural links with that region, which is coterminous with neighbouring Punjab and Hazara. Because their region was formerly a part of the princely state of Jammu and Kashmir and is named after it, many Azad Kashmiris have adopted the "Kashmiri" identity, whereas in an ethnolinguistic context, the term "Kashmiri" would ordinarily refer to natives of the Kashmir Valley region. The population of Azad Kashmir has strong historical, cultural and linguistic affinities with the neighbouring populations of upper Punjab and Potohar region of Pakistan.

In 2009, a consultation was undertaken into the effects of providing an individual tick-box for "Kashmiri" people in the UK census. The majority of those who took part in the consultation chose to self-identify as Pakistani and a decision was taken not to introduce a Kashmiri tick-box for the ethnic group question in the 2011 census.

The following ethnic codes are used in UK school ethnicity profiles:

 AMPK: Mirpuri Pakistani
 AKPA: Kashmiri Pakistani
 AKAO: Kashmiri Other

See also

 Azad Kashmiri diaspora
 British Pakistanis

References

Ethnic groups in the United Kingdom
Mirpur District
Muslim communities in Europe
Mirpuri diaspora
Pakistani diaspora in the United Kingdom